The 1951 Virginia Cavaliers football team represented the University of Virginia during the 1951 college football season. The Cavaliers were led by sixth-year head coach Art Guepe and played their home games at Scott Stadium in Charlottesville, Virginia. They finished with 8 wins for the second consecutive year, and were invited to play in the Orange Bowl, but University President Colgate Darden declined the invitation. Virginia was ranked 13th in the final AP Poll of the season, the first ranked finish in school history. It is to date the school's highest finish in a final poll.

Schedule

References

Virginia
Virginia Cavaliers football seasons
Virginia Cavaliers football